Peter Robb (born 19 July 1994) is a professional rugby union player from Ireland. He plays primarily as a centre, usually at inside centre for Ealing Trailfinders. Peter played for Irish provincial team Connacht in the Pro14 and in the European Rugby Champions Cup from 2014-2022.

Early life
Born in Dublin, Robb received his primary education at Willow Park school and is a graduate of Blackrock College. He attended University College Dublin and later NUI Galway after joining Galway-based Connacht.

Robb started playing rugby at young age, playing at either out-half or centre while at Willow Park and later moving permanently to centre while at Blackrock. Robb represented Leinster at different under-age levels, and during this time played his club rugby with Old Belvedere.

Club career

Connacht
Robb joined the Connacht academy in 2014. He did not feature for the senior side in his first year, but played for the province's second-tier side, the Connacht Eagles, during the course of the season. He made his senior Connacht debut in November 2015 against Enisei STM in freezing -20 °C conditions in Krasnoyarsk, Siberia, Russia as part of the second tier European Rugby Challenge Cup competition. At 107 kg he is known for his physical approach to play.

Ealing Trailfinders
On 29 June 2022, it was confirmed that Robb travelled to England to sign for Ealing Trailfinders in the RFU Championship from the 2022-23 season.

International career
Robb has represented Ireland at under-age international level. He was part of the Irish under-20 squad in the 2014 Six Nations Under 20s Championship, playing in all five games. Later that year, Robb was named in the squad for the 2014 Junior World Championship, but missed the tournament after picking up an injury in a warm up game.

References

External links
EPCR Profile
Ireland Under-20 Profile
Pro12 Profile
Ultimate Rugby Profile

1994 births
Living people
Irish rugby union players
Connacht Rugby players
Rugby union players from Dublin (city)
Old Belvedere R.F.C. players
People educated at Blackrock College
Rugby union centres
Expatriate rugby union players in England
Irish expatriate sportspeople in England
Irish expatriate rugby union players
Ealing Trailfinders Rugby Club players